This following is a list of members of the Italian Antimafia Commission, a bicameral body of the Italian Parliament, composed of members from the Chamber of Deputies and the Senate. The Antimafia Commission is a commission of inquiry into, initially, the "phenomenon of the Mafia". Subsequent commissions investigated "organized crime of the Mafia-type", which included other Italian criminal organizations such as the Camorra, the 'Ndrangheta and the Sacra Corona Unita.

Pino Arlacchi (PDS), vice-president 1994–1996
Abdon Alinovi (PCI), president 1983–1987
Rosy Bindi (PD), president 2013–present
Luigi Carraro (DC), president 1972–1976
Francesco Cattanei (DC), president 1968–1972
Roberto Centaro (FI), president 2001–2006
Gerardo Chiaromonte (PCI), vice-president 1972–1976; president 1988–1992
Ottaviano Del Turco (SDI), president 1996–2000
Antonio Di Pietro (IdV), 2008–
Francesco Forgione (PRC), president 2006–2008
Antonio Gullotti (DC), vice-president 1963–1968
Nicola La Penta (DC), president 1982–1983
Pio La Torre (PCI), 1972–1976
Girolamo Li Causi (PCI), vice-president 1963–1972
Giuseppe Lumia (PDS/DS), 2000–, president 2000–2001; vice-president 2006–2008
Giovanni Matta (DC)
Filippo Mancuso (FI), vice-president 1996–2000
Achille Occhetto (PCI), 1983–1987
Donato Pafundi (DC), president 1963–1968
Tiziana Parenti (FI), president 1994–1996
Ferruccio Parri (Independent Left), 1962–1968
Beppe Pisanu (PdL), president 2008–2013
Paolo Rossi (PSDI), president 1963
Oscar Luigi Scalfaro (DC)
Leonardo Sciascia (PR), 1982–1983
Cesare Terranova (Independent Left/PCI), 1972–1976
Walter Veltroni (PD) 2008–
Nichi Vendola (PRC), vice-president 2001–2005
Luciano Violante (PCI/PDS), 1983–1994; president 1992–1994
Claudio Vitalone (DC), vice-president 1983–1987
Carlo Vizzini (FI), 2001–2009

References

Organized crime-related lists
Antimafia
Anti
Italy law-related lists